Splash Splash Love is a South Korean television series starring Kim Seul-gi and Yoon Doo-joon. It initially aired on web platform Naver TV Cast in a 10-episode format. It was then broadcast by MBC on December 13 and 20, 2015 in two 60-minute episodes.

The series aired two years after the popular novel Moonlight Drawn by Clouds was serialized on Naver in 2013. Like Splash, Moonlight is about the love story between a cross-dressing eunuch and a monarch. The novel is the original work from which the drama Love in the Moonlight (2016) was adapted from.

Plot 
Danbi is a senior high school student taking the College Scholastic Ability Test (CSAT). However, she is not good at mathematics and was reluctant to take the exam. On exam day, she decides to run away and stop by a playground, wishing she would disappear when she heard a drum in a puddle of water nearby. As she has the ability to travel through spacetime, she took a leap of faith and jumped into the puddle of water and into the Joseon era.  

In Joseon, she is mistaken for a eunuch and serving in the palace she thus becomes a confidante of King Lee Do. Danbi finds that in the Joseon Dynasty, her high school level of math and science makes her the greatest scientist in the entire Kingdom. She falls in love with the King and inspires him in his reform the country.

However, fearing for their own privileges, Danbi becomes the target of traditionalist courtiers who seek her death. Having a hand in saving both the King and the Queen, Danbi becomes friends with the Queen who, in order to allow the King and Danbi to be together, endorses Danbi becoming a royal consort. Presented to the Queen Dowager, who is a doppelganger of her own mother, Danbi becomes very home sick and therefore decides to return to her era. Lee accepts her decision, and they leave, heading for the beach, where they share a passionate good bye with each other before Danbi disappears into the portal in the water. When she has disappeared, Lee swears that he will find her again, no matter how long it will take.

Back in her own time, Danbi one day watches a singer on the screen at her work, and is stunned that the artist is a living copy of the King's bodyguard. The singer declares a love song and sings about a "splash of love", when it suddenly starts to rain outside.

Outside on the street, Danbi notices a water pool and seriously considers stepping into it, returning to Lee, when she is suddenly approached by a man who silently holds up an umbrella over her head. She looks up and realizes he is the king, the living copy of Lee, and they stand silently looking into each other's eyes for a long while before he breaks the silence by telling her that they have met before - "a long time ago", he adds, and the viewer is shown a flashback of an earlier occasion on a bus where Danbi dropped her things on the floor and he helped her picking them up. It is heavily implied that he is the reincarnation of Lee, who has now finally found his love again just as he swore he would all those years ago.

Cast

Main cast 
 Kim Seul-gi as Jang Dan-bi / Jang Yeong-sil
 Yoon Doo-joon as Yi Do

Supporting cast 
 Jin Ki-joo as So-heon (Dan-bi's friend) / Queen Soheon of the Cheongsong Shim clan
 Ahn Hyo-seop as Park Yeon / Che Ah-jin
 Ko Kyu-pil as Dan-bi's math teacher / Head Eunuch
 Lee Kwang-se
 Kim Soo-hyun
 Uhm Hye-jung 
 Lee Jae-joon
 Kang Hyun
 Yoon Seok-ho as Seok (Park Yeon's younger brother)

Cameo 
 Kim Kap-soo as Prime Minister Hwang Hui
 Jung Kyu-soo as Shim On
 Im Ye-jin as Dan-bi's mother / Dowager Queen Hudeok of the Yeoheung Min clan
 Lee Dae-yeon as Choe Man-ri

Subtitle for each episode

Original soundtracks

Ratings

Awards and nominations

References

External links 
 
 

2015 South Korean television series debuts
Korean-language television shows
MBC TV television dramas
Television series set in the Joseon dynasty
South Korean time travel television series
2015 South Korean television series endings
South Korean romantic fantasy television series
2015 web series debuts
2015 web series endings
South Korean web series
Naver TV original programming
South Korean historical television series